Gastromyzon stellatus is a species of ray-finned fish in the genus Gastromyzon. Also known as a loach.

In a home aquarium, the fish need excellent water-flow and aeration as well as rocky hiding places. Lighting should be bright to encourage algal growth in the aquarium but plants are unnecessary. An aquarium with base dimensions of 75 ∗ 30 cm is large enough to house a group. A tight lid is important because the species can climb glass.

Footnotes

References

Gastromyzon
Fish described in 2006